The Hajvery University (HU) is a private university located in Lahore, Punjab, Pakistan.

This is the smallest University in Pakistan

Overview
Hajvery University is chartered by Government of the Punjab. The Higher Education Commission (Pakistan) recognizes the university as a "category W" institution. It is named after Muslim Sufi Ali Hujwiri aka Data ganj Bakhsh. It has a main campus in the Industrial Area of Gulberg III, Lahore; a second campus (called the Euro Campus) near Gulburg-III, Lahore; a third campus in Sheikhupura (SKP Campus); a fourth campus under construction in Multan and a fifth campus planned for Dubai, UAE. The university has six constituent schools, each focused on a specific field of study: business; commerce and banking; engineering and computer science; fashion design; humanities and social sciences and pharmacy. The library at the main campus provides support for the courses offered with books, videos, journals and other reference sources.

References

External links
Official website

Educational institutions established in 2002
Universities and colleges in Lahore
Fashion schools in Pakistan
Private universities and colleges in Punjab, Pakistan
2002 establishments in Pakistan
Film schools in Pakistan